Hypochalcia oxydella is a species of snout moth in the genus Hypochalcia. It was described by Ragonot in 1887, and is known from the Tian Shan mountains.

References

Moths described in 1887
Phycitini